Fabio Tripodi (born ) is an Italian wheelchair curler.

Teams

References

External links 

Player profile - FISG - Federazione Italiana Sport del Ghiaccio (Italian Ice Sports Federation)

Living people
1973 births
Italian male curlers
Italian wheelchair curlers